Anthony Stewart may refer to:

A. T. Q. Stewart (1929–2010), academic historian and author from Northern Ireland
Anthony Stewart (ice hockey) (born 1985), ice hockey player
Anthony Stewart (footballer) (born 1992), English footballer
Anthony Stewart (rugby league) (born 1979), Irish rugby league player
Anthony Stewart (basketball player) (born 1970), Australian basketball player
Anthony Stewart (basketball coach) (1970–2020), American college basketball coach
Anthony Stewart (businessman), owner of the ship Peggy Stewart, burned in the "Annapolis Tea Party", 1774

See also
Anthony Stuart (disambiguation)
Tony Stewart (disambiguation)